Mitwitz is a municipality in the district of Kronach in Bavaria in Germany. It lies on the Steinach river and the Föritz (which flows into the Steinach), on the edge of the Frankenwald on the route between Kronach and Coburg.

References

Kronach (district)